Harry is the surname of:

 Bill Harry (born 1938), creator of the newspaper Mersey Beat
 David G. Harry (1880–1955), American politician and farmer
 Debbie Harry (born 1945), American singer-songwriter and actress
 J. S. Harry (1939-2015), Australian poet
 John Harry (cricketer) (1857–1919), Australian cricketer
 John Harry (MP) (fl. 1410), MP for Hastings
 Michael Harry (born 1961), Danish curler
 N'Keal Harry (born 1997), American football player
 Robert Harry I, MP for Winchelsea in 1373 and 1382
 Robert Harry II, MP for Seaford in 1397 and 1399
 Troels Harry (born 1990), Danish curler